Lipova (German and Hungarian: Lippa; Serbian: Липова,  Lipova; Turkish: Lipva) is a town in Romania, Arad County, located in the Banat region.

The first written record of the town dates back to 1315 under the name Lipwa. In 1324 the settlement was mentioned as castellanus de Lypua, a place-name that reflects its reinforced character of that time.

Population

According to the census of 2011 the population of the town was 9,648 inhabitants. The ethnic groups were: 94% Romanians, 2.89% Hungarians, 1.47% Roma, 1.27% Germans, 0.07% Slovaks, 0.18% Ukrainians and 0.1% of other or undeclared nationalities.

Etymology
Its name is derived from the Slavic word lipa, linden tree, with the -ova suffix.

History
Situated at the crossing of the roads leading to Transylvania, Banat, and Wallachia, Lipova had a history full of vicissitudes. It was situated strategically at the Mureș River's exit from the defile, and consequently it was an extremely enviable centre. After the Tartar invasion in 1241 the fortresses were rebuilt, and the lines of the future urban settlement started to get contoured around the castle. Several names of famous historical personalities are related to this castle, such as John Hunyadi, Matthias Corvinus, György Dózsa, John Zápolya, etc. Due to the continuous disputes, the town has become four times under Turk administration (between 1552 and 1595, between 1613 and 1686, between 1690-1691 and between 1695 and 1716), and starting with 1716 it became under Habsburg domination. In the 18th-19th centuries Lipova was a well-developed economic centre with famous craftsmen working here. In the period of the revolution in 1848-49 and in the beginning of the 20th century Lipova became an important centre of political and national emancipation, due to the activity of remarkable personalities, such as Nicolae Bălcescu, Vasile Goldiș, and Teodor Șerb.

Șoimoș Castle has also taken part from the successive vicissitudinary periods related to the historical events of Lipova and
to the defensive role of the main entrance gate from Transylvania.

Tourist attractions
The car industry, light industry, services and tourism are the most representative economic sectors. The tourist sites of the town include both natural and anthropic elements. Due to the abundance of tourist attractions, Lipova is an important tourism centre.

Natives
 Carmen-Francesca Banciu (born 1955), novelist
 Alajos Degré (1819–1896), lawyer
 Atanasie Marian Marienescu (1830–1915), folklorist and judge
 Jovan Nenad (1492–1527), self-declared Emperor of Serbia
 Pahomije Tenecki (17th century), painter
 Stefan Tenecki (1720–1798), icon painter 
 Tinu Veresezan, singer
 Ion Vincze (1910–1996), communist activist

References

External links

 Town Hall site 
 Official Facebook Page of Lipova City 
 Official Google+ Page of Lipova City 

Populated places in Arad County
Towns in Romania
Localities in Romanian Banat
Spa towns in Romania
Place names of Slavic origin in Romania
Former capitals of Hungary